The 17th AARP Movies for Grownups Awards, presented by AARP the Magazine, honored films and television shows released in 2017 and were announced on February 5, 2018. The awards recognized films created by and about people over the age of 50. The ceremony was hosted by actor Alan Cumming at the Beverly Wilshire Hotel. This was the first year since 2015 that the ceremony was broadcast on television, airing on PBS as part of its Great Performances series on February 23, 2018.

This year marked the debut of the Best Ensemble award.

Awards

Winners and Nominees

Winners are listed first, highlighted in boldface, and indicated with a double dagger.

Career Achievement Award
 Helen Mirren: "Clearly the prime suspect for an award honoring an actress whose success grows with age: Ninety-three percent of her movies' $1.5 billion total earnings arrived after she turned 50, along with most of her top acting honors, including an Oscar for The Queen."

Films with multiple nominations and awards

References 

AARP Movies for Grownups Awards
AARP
AARP